Isfisor is a village and jamoat in north-west Tajikistan. It is located in Ghafurov District in Sughd Region. The jamoat has a total population of 39,590 (2015). It consists of 6 villages, including Isfisor (the seat) and Dashti Amin.

References

Populated places in Sughd Region
Jamoats of Tajikistan